The 1993 BMW Open was an Association of Tennis Professionals men's tennis tournament held in Munich, Germany. The tournament was held from 26 April through 3 May 1993. Second-seeded Ivan Lendl won the singles title.

Finals

Singles

 Ivan Lendl defeated  Michael Stich 7–6(7–2), 6–3
It was Lendl's 1st title of the year and the 99th of his career.

Doubles

 Martin Damm /  Henrik Holm defeated  Karel Nováček /  Carl-Uwe Steeb 6–0, 3–6, 7–5
It was Damm's 1st title of the year and the 1st of his career. It was Holm's 1st title of the year and the 1st of his career.

References

External links
 ATP – Tournament profile
 ITF – Tournament details